The Polygone Scientifique (en: Scientific Polygon) is a neighborhood of the city of Grenoble in France. It includes a significant number of research centers in a presque-isle between Isère and Drac.

History 
Polygon hosts in 1956 the first French Atomic Energy Commission (CEA) outside Paris and created by Professor Louis Néel. In 1962, it hosts a campus CNRS. In 1967, the Laboratoire d'électronique et de technologie de l'information was founded by CEA and became one of the world’s largest organizations for applied research in microelectronics and nanotechnology.

Three international organizations are implanted between 1973 and 1988 with the Institut Laue–Langevin, the European Synchrotron Radiation Facility and one of the five branches of the European Molecular Biology Laboratory. In 2006, the complex Minatec specializing in nanotechnology opens on the Polygon and in 2007, the Institut Néel, specializing in condensed matter physics, is founded.

National Laboratory for Intense Magnetic Fields has also numerous collaborations in terms of technical and technological innovations with these institutions.

In 2008, the new innovation campus is called GIANT (Grenoble Innovation for Advanced New Technologies).

In 2012, Clinatec is founded on Polygone Scientifique by Professor Alim-Louis Benabid.

Transportation 
The Polygon is served by Grenoble tramway.

See also 

National Institute for Materials Science

References

Bibliography

External links
 Official website of GIANT
 Project GIANT in 2007. 
 nims.go.jp NIMS and GIANT Conclude a Memorandum of Understanding on Collaborative Research Center.

Science parks in France
Science and technology in Grenoble
High-technology business districts in France
Information technology places
Educational institutions in Grenoble
Geography of Grenoble